The Dark Sky Observatory (DSO) is an astronomical observatory owned and operated by Appalachian State University (ASU).
It was established in 1981, and is used for research, instruction, and public viewing events.  The Cline Visitors' Center was completed in 2011.

Telescopes

A  Ritchey–Chrétien telescope was built by DFM Engineering, as was the equatorial fork mount.  It is the primary research tool at the observatory.
A  Cassegrain telescope on a German equatorial mount was installed in 1981.  It is used to monitor eclipsing binary stars and was once used to observe Mira variable stars.
 The  Dean Glace Telescope is a corrected Dall-Kirkham telescope made by Planewave and set on a Mathis equatorial fork mount.  It is shared between ASU and astrophotographer Dean Glace, who donated the telescope.
 A  C-14 Schmidt-Cassegrain Celestron reflector. The 14-inch remote robotic telescope, DSO-14, was assembled by Adam Smith for his Master's thesis project in 2009. It is automatically controlled by the Skynet Robotic Telescope Network in coordination with UNC-Chapel Hill. As well as offering queue-scheduled observing to both scientists and the general public, it is automatically commanded to observe the optical afterglows of Gamma-ray bursts within seconds of notification from the Swift Gamma-Ray Burst Mission.

Former telescopes

 A  reflecting telescope built by DFM Engineering was originally located at the Rankin Science Center on the ASU campus in Boone.  It was moved to DSO in 2003 while the building was being refurbished.  It was installed in the Rankin Science Observatory (RSO) on the roof of the building in 2005, where it is used for undergraduate instruction.
 A  Newtonian telescope was donated to ASU in 1982, and was permanently mounted in its own dome in 1985.  It was unused for several years before being removed in 2003.

See also
 Pisgah Astronomical Research Institute
 List of astronomical observatories

References

External links
 Department of Physics and Astronomy at ASU
 ASU Dark Sky Observatory Clear Sky Chart Forecasts of observing conditions.
 Skynet Telescope Operations

Astronomical observatories in North Carolina
Buildings and structures in Watauga County, North Carolina
Appalachian State University